Judy Flynn is a British actress. She is known for her roles as seamstress Madge Howell in the BBC drama The House of Eliott (1991–94), and as the secretary Julie in the BBC sitcom The Brittas Empire (1992–97). Her other television credits include two episodes of the Victoria Wood comedy dinnerladies (1999), and two episodes of Shameless (2012).

Filmography

Shameless (2012) as Daniella Feeney
Fast Freddie, The Widow and Me (2011) as Cathy
Ben & Holly's Little Kingdom (2009) as Mrs. Elf
Peppa Pig (2009–2017) as Mummy Dog, Mrs. Cow, Auntie Pig and Police Officer Squirrel
  Dalziel and Pascoe episode: "The Price of Fame" (2004) as Karen Clark
Heartbeat
"Bully Boys" (2008) as Angie Lomax
"No Man's Land" (2002) as Judy Parnaby
"Kindness of Strangers" (1999) as Jenny
The Bill
"Stolen Moments" (1996) as Linda Roberts
"Blood Rush: Part 1" (2008) as Jeanette Smith
Who Gets the Dog? (2007) as Sue Sullivan
Doctors
"See You in the Morning" (2007) as Penny Mitchum
"Power of Speech" (2010) as Jenny Prew
"Cheer Up Sleepy Genes" (2012) as Trudy Benedict
"Tough Love" (2015) as Marie Lissimore
"Crossing Palms" (2017) as Lyn Buckley
"Crashing Down" (2020) as Monica Levenson 
Holby City
"Care" (2001) as Julia Powell
"7 Days Later" (2005) as Maureen Rogers
"Actions Speak Louder" (2005) as Maureen Rogers
"Overload" (2005) as Maureen Rogers
"Leap of Faith" (2007) as Meg West
Hetty Wainthropp Investigates ”Mind Over Muscle” (1998) as Sonia
dinnerladies (Two episodes, 1999) as Val
The Brittas Empire (1992-1997) as Julie
The House of Eliott (1991- 1994) as Madge Howell/Althorpe
First of the Summer Wine (1988-1989) as Lena
Millie Inbetween (2016) as Mrs. Knope
Call the Midwife (2017) as Ada Ward
Ackley Bridge (2018) as Barbara Hammer
Hollyoaks (2019) as Mrs Maloney

Radio
The Blackburn Files (BBC Radio, 1989-1993) as Tracey Duggan

References

External links

Living people
Year of birth missing (living people)